Bryan Tetsadong Marceau Mbeumo (born 7 August 1999) is a professional footballer who plays as a winger or forward for  club Brentford and the Cameroon national team.

Mbeumo is a product of the Troyes AC academy and began his senior career with the club. He joined Brentford in 2019, and was a part of the squad which was promoted to the Premier League in 2021.

Mbeumo was capped by France at youth international level and made his full international debut for Cameroon in 2022. He was a member of Cameroon's 2022 World Cup squad.

Club career

Troyes AC
A winger, Mbeumo joined Troyes AC at the age of 14 and graduated to the club's reserve team in the 2016–17 season. He was a part of the Troyes U19 team which won the 2018 Coupe Gambardella and scored twice in the final at the Stade de France. Mbeumo made his senior debut for the club in a 1–0 Ligue 1 win over FC Metz on 17 February 2018 and made three further appearances during the 2017–18 season, which culminated in relegation to Ligue 2. The relegation allowed Mbeumo to break into the first team squad and he made 40 appearances and scored 11 goals during the 2018–19 season, which ended with defeat in the Ligue 2 promotion play-off semi-finals. He departed the Stade de l'Aube in August 2019, after making 46 appearances and scoring 12 goals for the club.

Brentford
On 5 August 2019, Mbeumo moved to England to join Championship club Brentford on a five-year contract for a club record £5.8 million fee. He made 47 appearances and scored 16 goals during the 2019–20 season, which ended with defeat in the 2020 Championship play-off Final. Mbeumo's performances were recognised with a nomination for the EFL Player of the Year and Young Player of the Year awards at the 2020 London Football Awards. Mbeumo's goal tally dropped off during a "difficult" COVID-19-affected 2020–21 season, but by March 2021, his 10 assists and four goals saw him nominated for the EFL Player of the Year award at the 2021 London Football Awards. Mbeumo finished Brentford's 2021 Championship play-off Final-winning 2020–21 season with 49 appearances and eight goals.

Mbeumo was deployed as a forward alongside Ivan Toney early in the 2021–22 season and by his 11th Premier League appearance, he had scored two goals and hit the woodwork seven times. Mbeumo's first hat-trick of his career (scored in a 4–1 FA Cup third round win over Port Vale on 8 January 2022) was also the first scored by a substitute in Brentford history and earned him a place in the Team of the Round and a nomination for Player of the Round. Three weeks later, he signed a new four-year contract, with a one-year option. Mbeumo ended the 2021–22 season with 38 appearances, eight goals and he tied with Raphinha for the record of most woodwork hits during the Premier League season, with seven.

During the 2022–23 pre-season friendlies, Mbeumo proved his versatility by at times being deployed as a wing back in a 3-4-3 formation.

International career

Mbeumo won 10 caps and scored one goal for France at U17, U20 and U21 level. In August 2022, following a meeting in London with Samuel Eto'o, Mbeumo declared his senior international allegiance to the Cameroon national team. He won his maiden call into a squad for a pair of friendlies versus Uzbekistan and South Korea in late September 2022 and started in both defeats. Mbeumo was named in Cameroon's 2022 World Cup squad and he started in each of the team's three matches prior to its exit at the end of the group stage.

Personal life
Mbeumo is of Cameroonian descent through his father, who is from Douala and his mother is French. In June 2020, he tested positive for COVID-19, but showed no symptoms and missed one match.

Career statistics

Club

International

Honours
Brentford
EFL Championship play-offs: 2021

References

External links

Bryan Mbeumo at brentfordfc.com

1999 births
Living people
People from Avallon
Sportspeople from Yonne
Cameroonian footballers
Cameroon international footballers
French footballers
France youth international footballers
France under-21 international footballers
French sportspeople of Cameroonian descent
Association football wingers
FC Bourgoin-Jallieu players
ES Troyes AC players
Brentford F.C. players
Championnat National 3 players
Ligue 1 players
Ligue 2 players
English Football League players
2022 FIFA World Cup players
Cameroonian expatriate footballers
French expatriate footballers
Expatriate footballers in England
French expatriate sportspeople in England
Black French sportspeople
Premier League players
Association football forwards
Footballers from Bourgogne-Franche-Comté